The Pakistan-China Fiber Optic Project is an 820 kilometer long optical fiber cable laid down between the Khunjerab Pass on the China-Pakistan border and the city of Rawalpindi. It has been constructed as part of the China–Pakistan Economic Corridor at an estimated cost of $44 million. Groundbreaking on the project took place on May 19, 2016 in the city of Gilgit. The line was first envisaged in 2009, with Pakistan and China signing an agreement in 2013 to implement the project . However the project was not implemented until being included as part of the China Pakistan Economic Corridor. Placement of the line will take an estimated 2 years, and will bring 3G and 4G connectivity to the Gilgit-Baltistan region. 

The line will connect the Transit Europe-Asia Terrestrial Cable Network with that of Pakistan, which currently transmits its telecom and internet traffic through four undersea fiber optic cables, with another three undersea fiber optic cables under construction.

466.54 kilometers of the route will be located in Gilgit-Baltistan, while 287.66 kilometers will be laid in Khyber Pakhtunkhwa province, 47.56 kilometers will be in Punjab province, and 18.2 kilometers in Islamabad Capital Territory. which will be extended to Gwadar.
 
The project is financed by the Exim Bank of China at a concessionary interest rate of 2%, versus the 1.6% typical of other CPEC infrastructure projects.

The project has been completed and inaugurated in July 2018.

References

China–Pakistan Economic Corridor
Nawaz Sharif administration
Cables
Optoelectronics
Optical telecommunications cables
Internet in Pakistan